The Shaw Library, or the Founder's Room, is a general-purpose library and a common room at the London School of Economics and Political Science. Located on the sixth floor of the Old Building, the library is accessible to all members of the university. It was founded by and named after Charlotte Payne-Townshend Shaw, wife of the playwright George Bernard Shaw.

The library includes the Fabian Window, a stained-glass window designed by George Bernard Shaw.

See also
 British Library of Political and Economic Science

References

London School of Economics
Academic libraries in London